Nail Narimanovich Mukhamedyarov is a Soviet weightlifter. He won a Silver medal in the 90 kg class at the 1988 Summer Olympics in Seoul. Mukhamedyarov also won a Silver medal in the 110 kg class at the 1990 World Weightlifting Championships in Budapest.

References

External links 
Profile at Infosport.ru 

1962 births
Living people
People from Andijan Region
Soviet male weightlifters
Uzbekistani male weightlifters

Olympic weightlifters of the Soviet Union
Weightlifters at the 1988 Summer Olympics
Olympic silver medalists for the Soviet Union
Olympic medalists in weightlifting
Medalists at the 1988 Summer Olympics
World Weightlifting Championships medalists
Ukrainian people of Crimean Tatar descent